The 1982–83 Boston Celtics season was the 37th season of the Boston Celtics in the National Basketball Association (NBA).

On March 30, 1983, Larry Bird scored 53 points against the Indiana Pacers, surpassing Sam Jones's Celtics single game scoring record set in 1965.

Draft picks

Roster

Regular season

Season standings

z – clinched division title
y – clinched division title
x – clinched playoff spot

Record vs. opponents

Game log

Regular season

Playoffs

|- align="center" bgcolor="#ccffcc"
| 1
| April 19
| Atlanta
| W 103–95
| Larry Bird (26)
| Robert Parish (16)
| Tiny Archibald (11)
| Boston Garden15,320
| 1–0
|- align="center" bgcolor="#ffcccc"
| 2
| April 22
| @ Atlanta
| L 93–95
| Robert Parish (17)
| Larry Bird (16)
| Larry Bird (9)
| Omni Coliseum10,405
| 1–1
|- align="center" bgcolor="#ccffcc"
| 3
| April 24
| Atlanta
| W 98–79
| Larry Bird (26)
| Robert Parish (11)
| Larry Bird (9)
| Boston Garden15,320
| 2–1
|-

|- align="center" bgcolor="#ffcccc"
| 1
| April 27
| Milwaukee
| L 95–116
| Tiny Archibald (23)
| Parish, Maxwell (12)
| Tiny Archibald (7)
| Boston Garden15,320
| 0–1
|- align="center" bgcolor="#ffcccc"
| 2
| April 29
| Milwaukee
| L 91–95
| Danny Ainge (25)
| Robert Parish (10)
| Gerald Henderson (8)
| Boston Garden15,320
| 0–2
|- align="center" bgcolor="#ffcccc"
| 3
| May 1
| @ Milwaukee
| L 99–107
| Larry Bird (21)
| Larry Bird (14)
| Maxwell, Bird (6)
| MECCA Arena11,052
| 0–3
|- align="center" bgcolor="#ffcccc"
| 4
| May 2
| @ Milwaukee
| L 93–107
| Larry Bird (18)
| Larry Bird (11)
| Larry Bird (8)
| MECCA Arena11,052
| 0–4
|-

References

See also
 1982–83 NBA season

Boston Celtics seasons
Boston Celtics
Boston Celtics
Boston Celtics
Celtics
Celtics